Else von Möllendorff (29 December 1913 – 28 July 1982) was a German film actress who appeared in a mixture of lead and supporting roles during the Nazi and post-war eras.

Partial filmography

 Ein falscher Fuffziger (1935) - Hilde Werner, Verkäuferin
 Ninety Minute Stopover (1936) - Ilse Siebeck
 Schüsse in Kabine 7 (1938) - Die Schiffsstewardeß
 Napoleon Is to Blame for Everything (1938) - Pünktchen (Madeleine)
 Ich verweigere die Aussage (1939) - Inge Rodeck, seine Frau
 The Scoundrel (1939) - Gusti Pitzinger
 In letzter Minute (1939) - Else
 Verwandte sind auch Menschen (1940) - Grete Braun
 The Fox of Glenarvon (1940) - Mary-Ann O'Connor
 Aus erster Ehe (1940) - Marion Dux
 Am Abend auf der Heide (1941) - Evi Birkner, Schauspielerin
 Familienanschluß (1941) - Helga Timm
  (1941) - Traute
 Drei tolle Mädels (1942) - Inge
 Beloved World (1942) - Rosi Hübner - Sekretärin
 I Entrust My Wife to You (1943) - Lil
 When the Young Wine Blossoms (1943) - Helene Arvik
 Alles aus Liebe (1943) - Liesl Dörfler - seine Frau
 Herr Sanders lebt gefährlich (1944) - Ellen Hinz, Sekretärin
 Ich habe von dir geträumt (1944) - Helene
 Peter Voss, Thief of Millions (1946) - Polly Petterson
 Finale (1948) - Schwester Marianne
 Verlobte Leute (1950) - Bärbel, die Dame auf dem Bild (final film role)

Bibliography

External links

1913 births
1982 deaths
German film actresses
Actresses from Munich
20th-century German actresses